Events in the year 1979 in Norway.

Incumbents
 Monarch – Olav V
 Prime Minister – Odvar Nordli (Labour Party)

Events

 Municipal and county elections are held throughout the country.
 Bryggen and the Urnes stave church are designated by UNESCO as World Heritage Sites.
 18 September – A fire in Vålerenga Church, which was later made into a song that became the club hymn for Vålerenga.

Popular culture

Sports

Music

Film

 March – the planet Hoth scenes from the Hollywood film "The Empire Strikes Back" were filmed in the Hardangerjøkulen glacier.

Television
 1 December – During an episode of Jul i Skomakergata on NRK, Sandmännchen premieres on Norwegian television for the first time.

Literature
Åge Rønning, writer and journalist, is awarded the Riksmål Society Literature Prize.
Nils Johan Rud, novelist, short story writer and magazine editor, is awarded the Dobloug Prize for Swedish and Norwegian fiction.
Bjørg Vik, writer, playwright and journalist, is awarded the Norwegian Critics Prize for Literature for the short stories En håndfull lengsel.

Notable births

1 January – Anders Danielsen Lie, actor
4 January – Audun Ellingsen, jazz musician
5 January – Håvard Klemetsen, Nordic combined skier
7 January – Andreas Hauger, footballer
8 January – John Anders Bjørkøy, footballer
11 January – Kari Mette Johansen, handball player.
12 January – Åsa Elvik, politician
13 January – Einar Kalsæg, footballer
16 January – Espen Isaksen, footballer
20 January – Marte Reenaas, ski orienteering competitor
21 January – Thomas Berling, footballer
22 January – Ailo Gaup, motocross rider
22 January – Svein Oddvar Moen, footballer
23 January – Jarl Espen Ygranes, ice hockey player
24 January – Anita Auglend, singer
2 February – Olav Råstad, footballer
11 February – Joachim Sørum, footballer
6 March – Aksel Magdahl, sailor
11 March – Roger Hjelmstadstuen, snowboarder
11 March – Morten Tandberg, football manager
13 March – Børge Lund, handball player.
13 March – Espen Olsen, footballer
15 March – Ola Berger, ski mountaineer anc cross-country skier
17 March – Tuva Moflag, politician.
20 March – Liv Kjersti Bergman, biathlete
23 March – Jostein Hasselgård, singer
2 April – Stian Westerhus, guitarist
5 April – Jørgen Tengesdal, footballer
8 April – Rune Stordal, speed skater
9 April – André Jørgensen, handball player
10 April – Kai Risholt, footballer
10 April – Roger Risholt, footballer
12 April – Thomas Dybdahl, musician
12 April – Lars Granaas, footballer
14 April – Bård Nesteng, archer
17 April – Hanne Hukkelberg, singer-songwriter
20 April – Stian Barsnes-Simonsen, actor
20 April – Kenneth Kapstad, musician
23 April – Saera Khan, politician.
24 April – Tor Henning Hamre, footballer
25 April – Nils-Torolv Simonsen, rower
25 April – Martin Sjølie, pianist, songwriter and record producer
1 May – Lars Berger, biathlete.
2 May – Oddrun Brakstad Orset, ski mountaineer
4 May – Morten Kolseth, footballer
6 May – Jan Erik Mikalsen, composer
7 May – Henrik Bjørnstad, golf player
8 May – Marius Erlandsen, auto racing driver
8 May – Alf Wilhelm Lundberg, jazz musician
8 May – Ole Johan Singsdal, footballer
8 May – Ole Morten Vågan, jazz musician
10 May – Isabel Blanco, handball player.
16 May – Hermund Nygård, jazz musician
20 May – Torgeir Micaelsen, politician.
21 May – Svein-Erik Edvartsen, footballer
22 May – Christer-André Cederberg, music producer
26 May – Joachim Hansen, mixed martial artist
29 May – Ella Gjømle Berg, cross-country skier.
8 June – Jacob Norenberg, sprint canoer.
13 June – Nila Håkedal, beach volleyball player.
21 June – Henning Braaten, skateboarder
23 June – Susanna Wallumrød, singer
25 June – Haddy N'jie, singer, songwriter, writer and journalist
26 June – Mathias Eick, jazz musician
3 July – Erik Lund, rugby union footballer
4 July – Lene Westgaard, political scientist
17 July – Lars Rørbakken, strongman
21 July – Ingrid Tørlen, beach volleyball player.
24 July – Heidi Skjerve, jazz musician
26 July – Bodil Ryste, ski mountaineer and cross-country skier
3 August – Maria Haukaas Mittet, singer
4 August – 
Torgeir Ruud Ramsli, footballer
Mona Solheim, taekwondo practitioner.
Nina Solheim, taekwondo practitioner
8 August – Ellinor Jåma, politician
9 August – Tore Ruud Hofstad, cross-country skier
10 August – Ove Alexander Billington, jazz pianist and composer
11 August – Christer George, footballer
22 August – Henriette Løvar, curler
27 August – Erik Watndal, sport shooter.
31 August – Camilla Huse, footballer
3 September – Stian Eckhoff, biathlete.
5 September – Kjersti Beck, handball goalkeeper
5 September – John Carew, footballer
11 September – Kenneth Høie, footballer
13 September – Linda Grubben, biathlete
15 September – Mahmoud Farahmand, politician.
15 September – Atle Gulbrandsen, racing driver and television announcer
22 September – Alex Valencia, footballer
23 September – Lisa Loven Kongsli, actress
24 September – Stine Hofgaard Nilsen, alpine skier
2 October – Kjetil Strand, handball player
5 October – Lisa Wiik, snowboarder
8 October – Wilhelm Brenna, ski jumper
9 October – Veronika Flåt, actress
10 October – Espen Søgård, footballer
14 October – Marcus Paus, composer
19 October – Ingunn Ringvold, roots singer, musician and songwriter
19 October – Magne Sturød, footballer
24 October – Lise Birgitte Fredriksen, sailor
1 November – Tommy Knarvik, footballer
2 November – Nina Ellen Ødegård, actress
8 November – Erling Sande, politician
10 November – Ragnvald Soma, footballer
30 November – Ellen Blom, ski mountaineer
3 December – Kjersti Annesdatter Skomsvold, writer
6 December – Tommy Wirkola, film director, producer and screenwriter 
10 December – Tora Augestad, musician
14 December – Øystein Runde, comics writer and comics artist
18 December – Tone Hatteland Lima, cyclist
18 December – Øyvind Storflor, footballer
20 December – Espen Johnsen, footballer
20 December – Benedikte Shetelig Kruse, singer and actor
27 December – Hanne Sørvaag, musician
28 December – Daniel Forfang, ski jumper

Full date missing
Dolk (artist), graffiti artist
Torbjørn Ringdal Hansen, chess player
Morten Morland, cartoonist
Robert Post, singer-songwriter
Einar Selvik, musician
Stein Urheim, jazz musician

Notable deaths

7 January – Thoralf Hagen, rower and Olympic bronze medallist (b.1887)
28 January – Elling Enger, composer, organist, and choir conductor (b.1905)
4 February – Hans Martin Gulbrandsen, canoeist (b.1914)
15 February – Karl Henry Karlsen, politician (b.1893)
7 March – Klaus Egge, composer and music critic (b.1906)
3 April – Dagfinn Zwilgmeyer, psalmist (b. 1900).
6 April – Finn Øen, politician (b.1902)
17 April – Trygve Olsen, politician (b.1921)
26 April – Trygve Stokstad, boxer (b.1902)
7 May – Erik Brofoss, economist, politician and Minister (b.1908)
8 June – Magnar Isaksen, international soccer player and Olympic bronze medallist (b.1910).
5 July – Rolf Holmberg, soccer player and Olympic bronze medallist (b.1914)
10 July – Harald Færstad, gymnast and Olympic silver medallist (b.1889)
15 July – Haakon Sløgedal, politician (b.1901)
28 July – Steffen Ingebriktsen Toppe, politician (b.1902)
6 August – Olav Hordvik, politician (b.1901)
24 August – Bernt Evensen, speed skater, Olympic gold medallist and racing cyclist (b.1905)
22 September – Tore Segelcke, actress (b.1901)
30 September – Johan Johannesen, track and field athlete (b.1898)
16 October – Johan Borgen, author, journalist and critic (b.1902)
16 October – Olav Svalastog, politician (b.1896)
14 December – Otto Monsen, track and field athlete (b.1887)

Full date unknown
Emil Boyson, poet, author, and translator (b.1897)
Anders Frihagen, politician and Minister (b.1892)
Gunnar Emil Garfors, poet (b.1900)
Jørgen Holmboe, meteorologist (b.1902)
Rolf Østbye, businessperson (b.1898)
Rolf Ingvar Semmingsen, civil servant (b.1908)
Nils Thomas, sailor and Olympic silver medallist (b.1889)

See also

References

External links

Norway, 1979 In